Theodor Leschetizky (sometimes spelled Leschetitzky, ; 22 June 1830 – 14 November 1915 was an Austrian-Polish pianist, professor, and composer born in Landshut in the Kingdom of Galicia and Lodomeria, then a crown land of Austria-Hungary.

Life
Theodor Leschetizky was born on 22 June 1830 at the estate of the family of Count Potocki in Landshut, Austrian Galicia. Joseph Leschetizky, his father, was a gifted pianist and music teacher of Viennese birth. His mother Thérèse von Ullmann was a gifted singer of German origin. His father gave him his first piano lessons and then took him to Vienna to study with Carl Czerny. At age eleven, he performed a Czerny piano concerto in Landshut, with Franz Xaver Wolfgang Mozart, the son of Wolfgang Amadeus Mozart, conducting. At the age of fifteen he started to tutor his first students. By the age of eighteen he was a well-known virtuoso in Vienna and beyond. His composition teacher was Simon Sechter, an eminent professor who was the teacher of many other successful musicians.

At the invitation of his friend Anton Rubinstein, he went to St. Petersburg to teach in the court of the Grand Duchess Yelena Pavlovna. Remaining there from 1852 to 1877, he was head of the piano department and one of the founders of the St. Petersburg Conservatory of Music in 1862. While in Russia he married one of his most famous students, Anna Essipova, the second of his four wives, with whom he had two children; one of them was his daughter, the well-known singer and teacher, Theresa, the other was his son Robert.

In 1878 he returned to Vienna and began teaching there, creating one of the most eminent private piano schools in the world. Promising pianists flocked to his villa in the Währing Cottage District on Karl-Ludwig-Straße, Vienna, coming from all over the world, with a great many from the United States, among them singer Clara Clemens, the daughter of Mark Twain.

From 1904 to 1908, he was assisted by one of his students, Ethel Newcomb, an experience which proved a fertile ground for background research for her 1921 book, Leschetizky as I Knew Him. Concert pianist and teacher Edwin Hughes was his assistant in 1909 and 1910.

He taught until the age of 85, thereafter leaving for Dresden, where he died on 14 November 1915.

Motto
Leschetizky's motto: "No life without art, no art without life!"

Leschetizky's descendants 
He was survived by a son, Robert (Dresden), whose family returned to Bad Ischl after his death. His descendants still live in Bad Ischl and there is a Leschetizky Villa on Leschetizky-Straße, the summer resort where he often vacationed with his friend Johannes Brahms.

Leschetizky had a granddaughter, Ilse Leschetizky (1910–1997), who was a distinguished pianist and teacher. One of her daughters, Margret Tautschnig, continues the Leschetizky tradition with the Leschetizky-Verein Österreich in Bad Ischl. This organisation was co-founded by the Belgian pianist Peter Ritzen.

Leschetizky the composer 
Leschetizky composed over a hundred characteristic piano pieces, two operas: Die Brüder von San Marco and Die Erste Falte, thirteen songs and a one-movement piano concerto. Opus numbers were given to 49 works.

Although his piano pieces are primarily smaller works in the salon music vein, they are expressively lyrical on the one hand while exploiting the piano's technical capabilities to great effect on the other.  Most of his music has been out of print since the early twentieth century except for the Andante Finale, Op. 13 (a paraphrase for piano left hand on the famous sextet from the opera Lucia di Lammermoor by Donizetti); and Les deux alouettes, Op. 2, No. 1.

Leschetizky the teacher 
His most important legacy is as the main teacher of numerous great pianists such as Ignacy Jan Paderewski, Aline van Barentzen, Ernesto Bérumen, Alexander Brailowsky, Agnes Gardner Eyre, Ignaz Friedman, Ossip Gabrilowitsch, Florence Parr Gere, Katharine Goodson, Mark Hambourg, Helen Hopekirk, Mieczysław Horszowski, Edwin Hughes, Frank La Forge, Mabel Lander, Ethel Leginska, Marguerite Melville Liszniewska, Frank Merrick, Benno Moiseiwitsch, Elly Ney, Marie Novello, John Powell, Auguste de Radwan, Zudie Harris Reinecke, Artur Schnabel, Richard Singer, Józef Śliwiński, Bertha Tapper, Isabelle Vengerova, Maria Wilhelmj, Paul Wittgenstein, Fannie Bloomfield Zeisler and many others.

Recordings 
 In February 1906, Leschetizky recorded twelve piano rolls for Welte-Mignon, including seven of his own compositions.
 Piano Concerto, Piano works - Hubert Rutkowski, piano Acte Préalable AP0191, © 2008 (CD)
 Piano Concerto, op.9; Overture to "Die erste Falte/ Contes de Jeunesses" - Peter Ritzen, piano Naxos Records 8.223803 (CD)
 Piano Works (with the famous left hand piece Andante Finale, op.13) - Peter Ritzen, piano Naxos Records 8.223525 (CD)
 Leschetizky Piano Music Centaur CRC2319

Bibliography 
 Theodor Leschetizky, Das Klavierwerk. Cologne: Haas 2000.

See also 
 List of Leschetizky's students

References

Further reading 
 Malwine Brée: The groundwork of the Leschetizky method: issued with his approval / by Malwine Brée; with forty-seven illustrative cuts of Leschetizky's hand; translated from the German by Dr. Th. Baker. Mayence (Mainz), 1903.
 Malwine Brée: The Leschetizky method: a guide to fine and correct piano playing. English translation by Arthur Elson; introduction by Seymour Bernstein. Mineola, Dover Publications, 1997.
 Newcomb, Ethel. Leschetizky as I Knew Him. New York, New York: D. Appleton and Company, 1921.
 Annette Hullah: Theodor Leschetizky. Bilinguale Neuausgabe/Bilingual New Edition. Herausgegeben und kommentiert/Edited and commented von/by Burkhard Muth (=Studien, Beiträge und Materialien zur Leschetizky-Forschung, Band 1). Fernwald, Muth. 2020 ISBN 978-3-929379-50-1
 Comtesse Angèle Potocka: Theodore Leschetizky, an intimate study of the man and the musician. New York, The Century co., 1903
 Annette Hullah: Theodor Leschetizky. London, Lane, 1906 (Reprinted 1923).
 Markus von Hänsel-Hohenhausen: There can be no life without art, and no art without life - Theodor Leschetizky, in: M. v. H.-H.: On the Wonder of the Countenance in its Photographic Portrait. Charleston 2013, 
 Tobias Bigger: Thoughts and hints in the context of the interpretation of Leschetizky's piano works opp. 36, 38, 43, 44 and 47 (recorded by T. Bigger in 2019 and published in 2020 by Swedish label BIS as hybrid SACD BIS 2518); pdf file with German text under the title "With Theodor Leschetizky in the piano workshop", linked under https://tbigger.12hp.de/seite30.html.

External links

 
 The Leschetizky Association
 
 Theodor Leschetizky today playing his 1906 interpretations (The Welte Mignon Mystery vol. XIII)
 Piano Rolls (The Reproducing Piano Roll Foundation)
 Leschetizky Piano Concerto op. 9 /Overture/ Piano Pieces (Peter Ritzen, Piano)
 Leschetizky Piano Works (Peter Ritzen, Piano)
 Leschetizky Piano Music (Clara Park, Piano)
 Pupils of Leschetizky (Japanese & English contents)
 Aline van Barentzen - Recital Chopin & Liszt (Reissued CD)
 Aline van Barentzen - Recital de Piano (Reissued CD)
 Scores by Theodor Leschetizky in digital library Polona

1830 births
1915 deaths
19th-century classical composers
19th-century classical pianists
19th-century male musicians
20th-century classical composers
20th-century classical pianists
20th-century male musicians
Polish Romantic composers
Polish classical pianists
Polish emigrants to the United States
Polish male classical composers
Polish music educators
Male classical pianists
Piano pedagogues
People from Łańcut
Pupils of Carl Czerny
Pupils of Simon Sechter